Muhammad Suleiman (Also Mohammad Sulayman) (1959 – 1 August 2008) was a Syrian Army General and Special Presidential Advisor for Arms Procurement and Strategic Weapons to Syrian president Bashar al-Assad.

He was killed in Tartus, Syria on 1 August 2008 in an Israeli special forces operation.

Early life
Suleiman was born in 1959 to a rich aristocratic Alawite family.

Career
Suleiman had been a top aide to Bashar al Assad even before he assumed the presidential office, from the time he appeared as heir to succeed his father, Hafez al-Assad, as president. Former Director General of Mossad Meir Dagan used to refer to him as the 'Commander of the Shadow Army'. Israel's Military Intelligence AMAN believed he had 'extraordinary organizational and logistical abilities'.

He was also in charge of highly classified military and intelligence work, such as handling relations with the IAEA and the construction of the nuclear Al Kibar facility. He handled secretive intelligence affairs for the president and was reportedly also in charge of arms transfers from Syria to Hezbollah and Hamas in neighbouring Lebanon and Gaza. He had also built very close ties with Hezbollah's chief of staff Imad Mughniyeh and Iranian General Qasem Soleimani.

Assassination and perpetrators
It was reported by Iranian media that Suleiman was shot by a silenced weapon in the head and neck on a beach at al-Rimal al-Zahabiyeh resort near Tartus on 1 August 2008. According to the As-Safir newspaper, arrested Mossad spy Ali Jarrah "testified to have scouted 'certain points' in the coastal town of Tartus in northern Syria," where Suleiman was assassinated. The Sunday Times reported that Suleiman was assassinated by Israeli Special Forces.

A cable released by WikiLeaks revealed that France told the United States that Suleiman was probably killed as a result of political rivalry within the Syrian government. Maher al-Assad, brother of the Syrian president, was likely to have ordered the killing. Furthermore, France said that Suleiman was not killed by a sniper, but in fact gunned down in his car.

In a 2009 article regarding the destruction of Al Kibar, Der Spiegel gives a detailed description of Suleiman's assassination as having taken place by sniper shots from a passing yacht and implies that it was linked to his direct involvement in the construction the Al Kibar Nuclear facility and strong ties to Hezbollah and Iran.

In 2015, a National Security Agency document leaked by Edward Snowden revealed that Israel was indeed directly behind Suleiman's killing. According to the document, the assassination was carried out by the Shayetet 13 naval commando unit.

According to a book by Michael Bar-Zohar and Nissim Mishal, Suleiman was assassinated by two Shayetet 13 snipers who had dived to the beach that his villa overlooked from a boat about a mile offshore. The two commandos, whose guns were fitted with silencers, shot him simultaneously after an electronic signal beeped in their earphones, then withdrew.

Funeral
Suleiman was buried on 3 August 2008. The funeral was attended by Maher al-Assad.
The New Yorker quotes an unnamed former Israeli official: "There was no funeral, no event. Nothing. They never admitted that he was killed. He just disappeared".

Aftermath
According to a U.S. State Department cable published by WikiLeaks, Syrian authorities found $80 million in cash in the basement of Suleiman's home. This reportedly upset President Assad, who launched an investigation into how Suleiman obtained that much money.

Sources

1959 births
2008 deaths
Assassinated military personnel
Syrian generals
Assassinated Syrian people
Deaths by firearm in Syria
Syrian Alawites
Targeted killing
People killed in Mossad operations